WPKN (89.5 FM) is a non-commercial radio station licensed by the Federal Communications Commission (FCC) to Bridgeport, Connecticut. WPKN is a free-form radio station, staffed by volunteer programmers presenting a wide variety of music and public affairs programming. The syndicated weekly radio newsmagazine Between the Lines, a weekly show, was first produced  in 1991 with Scott Harris, Denise Manzari, Bob Nixon, environmental journalist Jim Motavalli and many others at WPKN. Since 1993, Harris has been Between The Lines' executive producer.

History

WPKN was founded in 1963 as the college radio station of the University of Bridgeport, but became independent of the university in 1989. The call letters originally stood for "Purple Knights Network," named after the university's sports teams.

Many stations below the 92 MHz FM band receive funds from commercial entities despite being part of the non-commercial radio band. This is thought by some to present the potential for conflicts of interest. WPKN only takes funds from private donors with no stipulations for their expenditure attached. This allows the music and news programmers complete freedom to produce their own shows with no outside pressure.

WPKN also had a carrier current on 540 AM.

In a 2021 article for The New Yorker, David Owen labeled WPKN "the greatest radio station in the world", praising its human-made playlists in comparison to "corporate algorithms" on other radio stations.

See also

List of community radio stations in the United States

References

External links 
 

Radio stations established in 1963
University of Bridgeport
Mass media in Hartford County, Connecticut
PKN
Mass media in Bridgeport, Connecticut
Mass media in Fairfield County, Connecticut
Community radio stations in the United States
1963 establishments in Connecticut